Alcorn's pocket gopher (Pappogeomys bulleri alcorni) is a subspecies of rodent in the family Geomyidae. It is endemic to Mexico.  Its natural habitat is montane pine-oak forest (910-3,010 m) in the Sierra del Tigre of south Jalisco. It is reputed to damage corn and bean fields and has been persecuted by farmers as a pest. The species is considered to be critically endangered.

References 

Pappogeomys
Endemic mammals of Mexico
Natural history of Jalisco
Mammals described in 1957
Critically endangered animals
Critically endangered biota of Mexico
Taxonomy articles created by Polbot
Taxobox binomials not recognized by IUCN